The Men's Field Hockey Qualifier for the 2007 Pan American Games was a field hockey series between the United States and Mexico to determine the last entry into the men's field hockey competition at the 2007 Pan American Games. All games were played in  Hamilton, Bermuda from 8 to 11 March 2007.

The United States won the series and qualified for the 2007 Pan American Games.

Results

Standings

Matches

References

Men's Qualifier
2007 Pan American Games Qualifier
Pan American Games Field Hockey Qualifier
Pan American Games Field Hockey Qualifier